Juditha azan is a butterfly of the family Riodinidae. It is found in most of South America.

Subspecies
The following subspecies are recognised:
Juditha azan azan (Brazil (Rio de Janeiro))
Juditha azan majorina (Guianas, Brazil (Amazon to Mato Grosso), Venezuela, Trinidad)
Juditha azan completa (western Brazil, western Amazon, Colombia, Peru, Bolivia)

Nymphidiini
Riodinidae of South America